Lost & Found is a compilation album by Australian country music artist Troy Cassar-Daley. The album was released digitally in March 2018.

Upon release Cassar-Daley said “Lost & Found is a collection of songs that have only been B-sides on singles or never been commercially available anywhere.” He added “I opened up an old suitcase in the corner of my studio that I've had since my teens and found tapes, old lyrics and CDs of tunes I'd forgotten I'd written. So I set up my tape deck, DAT player and CD player to listen and the first thing that came to mind was these need to be shared not stored and forgotten by time.“

The album includes Cassar-Daley's debut single "Proud Young Man", only ever available before on 7" vinyl.

Track listing

Charts

Release history

References

2018 compilation albums
Troy Cassar-Daley albums
Liberation Records albums
Compilation albums by Australian artists